Oric was the name used by UK-based Tangerine Computer Systems for a series of 6502-based home computers sold in the 1980s, primarily in Europe.

With the success of the ZX Spectrum from Sinclair Research, Tangerine's backers suggested a home computer and Tangerine formed Oric Products International Ltd to develop the Oric-1. The computer was introduced in 1982. During 1983, approximately 160,000 Oric-1 computers were sold in the UK, plus another 50,000 in France (where it was the year's top-selling machine). This resulted in Oric being acquired and given funding for a successor model, the 1984 Oric Atmos. 

Oric was bought by Eureka, which produced the less successful Oric Telestrat (1986). Oric was dissolved the year the Telestrat was released. Eastern European legal clones of Oric machines were produced into the 1990s.

Models

Oric-1 
Based on a 1 MHz MOS Technology 6502 CPU, the Oric-1 came in 16 KB or 48 KB RAM variants for £129 and £169 respectively, matching the models available for the popular ZX Spectrum and undercutting the price of the 48 KB version of the Spectrum by a few pounds. The circuit design requires 8 memory chips, one chip per data line of the CPU. Due to the sizing of readily available memory chips the 48 KB model has 8 * 8 KB (64 KBit) chips, making a total of 64 KB. As released only 48 KB is available to the user, with the top 16 KB of memory overlaid by the BASIC ROM;
The optional disc drive unit contains some additional hardware that allows it to enable or disable the ROM, effectively adding 16 KB of RAM to the machine. This additional memory is used by the system to store the Oric DOS software. Both Oric-1 versions have a 16 KB ROM containing the operating system and a modified BASIC interpreter.

The Oric-1 has a sound chip, the programmable General Instrument AY-3-8910.

Two graphics modes are handled by a semi-custom ASIC (HSC 10017 ULA) which also manages the interface between the processor and memory. The two modes are a "LORES" (low resolution) text mode (though the character set can be redefined to produce graphics) with 28 rows of 40 characters and a "HIRES" (high resolution) mode with 200 rows of 240 pixels above three lines of text. Like the Spectrum, the Oric-1 suffers from attribute clash–albeit to a much lesser degree in HIRES mode, since 2 different colours can be defined for each 6x1 block of 6 pixels,

The system has a built-in television RF modulator as well as RGB output. A standard audio tape recorder can be used for external storage. There is a Centronics compatible printer interface.

Technical details
 CPU: MOS 6502 @ 1 MHz
 Operating system: Tangerine/Microsoft Extended Basic v1.0
 ROM: 16 KB
 RAM: 16 KB / 48 KB
 Sound: AY-3-8912 
 Graphics: 40×28 text characters/ 240×200 pixels, 8 colours
 Storage: tape recorder, 300 and 2400 baud
 Input: integrated keyboard
 Connectivity: Tape recorder I/O, Centronics compatible printer port, RGB video out, RF out, expansion port
 Voltage: 9 V
 Power consumption: Max 600 milliamps

Oric Atmos
In late 1983 the funding cost for continued development of Oric caused external funding to be sought, and eventually led to a sale to Edenspring Investments PLC. The Edenspring money enabled Oric International to release the Oric Atmos, which added an improved keyboard and an updated V1.1 ROM to the Oric-1. The faulty tape error checking routine was still there (See "Cassette Interface" under Technical specification, below).

Soon after the Atmos was released, the modem, printer and 3-inch floppy disk drive originally promised for the Oric-1 were announced and released by the end of 1984. A short time after the release of the Atmos machine, a modification for the Oric-1 was issued and advertised in magazines and bulletin boards. This modification enabled the Oric-1 user to add a second ROM (containing the Oric Atmos system) to a spare ROM-socket on the Oric-1 circuit board. Then, using a switch, the users could then switch between the new Oric Atmos ROM and the original Oric-1 ROM. This was desirable since the updated ROM of the Atmos contained breaking changes for some games which relied on certain behaviours or memory addresses within the ROM. This led to tape based software often containing a 1.1 ROM/Atmos version of the software on one side of the cassette, with a 1.0 ROM/Oric-1 version on the other. Earlier titles from publishers that no longer existed or had stopped producing software for the Oric were unlikely to be updated.

Oric Stratos and Oric Telestrat

Although the Oric Atmos had not turned around Oric International's fortunes, in February 1985, they announced several models including the Oric Stratos/IQ164. Despite their backers putting them into receivership the following day, Oric was bought by French company Eureka, which continued to produce the Stratos, followed by the Oric Telestrat in late 1986.

The Stratos and Telestrat increased the RAM to 64 KB and added more ports, but kept the same processor and graphics and sound hardware as the Oric-1 and Atmos.

The Telestrat is a telecommunications-oriented machine. It comes with a disk drive as standard, and only connects to an RGB monitor / TV. The machine is backward compatible with the Oric-1 and Oric Atmos by using a cartridge. Most of the software is in French, including Hyper-BASIC's error messages. Up to 6000 units were sold in France. 

In December 1987, after announcing the Telestrat 2, Oric International went into receivership for the second and final time.

Technical specification

Keyboard
The keyboard has 57 moving keys with tactile feedback. It is capable of full upper and lower case with a correctly positioned space bar. It has a full typewriter pitch. The key layout is a standard QWERTY with ESC, CTRL, RETURN and additional cursor control keys. All keys have auto repeat.

Display
The display adapter will drive a PAL UHF colour or black and white television receiver on approximately Channel 36. RGB output is also provided on a 5 pin DIN 41524 socket.

Character mode
In character mode the Oric displays 28 lines of 40 characters, producing a display very similar to Teletext. The character set is standard ASCII which is enhanced by the addition of 80 user-definable characters. ASCII characters may also be re-defined as these are down loaded into RAM on power-up. Serial attributes are used to control display features, as in Teletext, and take up one character position. All remaining characters on that line are affected by the serial attribute until either the line ends or another serial attribute.

Display features are:

 Select background colour (paper) from one of eight.
 Select foreground colour (ink) from one of eight.
 Flash characters on and off approximately twice a second.
 Produce double height characters (even line top, odd line bottom).
 Switch over to user-definable character set. This feature is used to produce Teletext-style colour graphics without the need for additional RAM.

Available colours are black, blue, red, magenta, green, cyan, yellow, and white.

Each character position also has a parallel attribute, which may be operated on a character by character basis, to produce video inversion. The display has a fixed black border.

Screen graphics mode
The graphics mode consists of 200 pixels vertically by 240 pixels horizontally plus 3 lines of 40 characters (the same as character mode) at the bottom of the screen to display system information and to act as a window on the user program while still viewing the graphics display. It can also be used to input direct commands for graphics and see the effect instantly without having to switch modes. The graphics display operates with serial attributes in the same way as characters, except that the display is now considered as 200 lines by 40 graphics cells. Each graphic cell is therefore very flexible by having 8 foreground and 8 background colours and flashing patterns. The video invert parallel attribute is also usable in this mode. ASCII characters may be painted over the graphics area, thus enabling the free mixing of graphics and text.

Sound
The Oric has an internal loudspeaker and amplifier and can also be connected to external amplifiers via the 7 Pin DIN 45329 shared with the cassette interface. A General Instruments AY-3-8912 provides 3 channel sound.

For BASIC programs, four keywords generate pre-made sounds: PING, SHOOT, EXPLODE, and ZAP. The commands SOUND, MUSIC, and PLAY produce a broader range of sounds.

Cassette interface
The cassette recorder connects via a 7 Pin DIN 45329 socket shared with the external sound output. The interface includes support for tape motor control. Recording speeds offered as standard are 300 baud or 2400 baud. A tone leader allows tape recorders' automatic level control to stabilise before the filename, followed by the actual data with parity; finally, checksums are recorded to allow overall verification of the recording. 

The circuit was designed using a Schmitt trigger to remove noise and make input more reliable. The system allows for verification of stored information against the tape copy, to ensure integrity before the information is flushed from memory. There was however a bug within the error-checking of recorded programs, often causing user-created programs to fail when loaded back in, this bug persist in the updated ROMs for the Oric Atmos. 

Available basic commands are CLOAD, CSAVE (for programs and memory dumps), STORE, RECALL (for arrays of string, integer or real, added with Oric Atmos roms). Filenames up to 16 characters can be specified.  Options on the commands exist for slow speed, verification, autorunning of programs or specification of start and ending addresses for dumping memory.

Expansion port 
The expansion port allows full access to the CPU's data address and control lines. This allows connection of add-ons specifically designed for the Oric, including user designed hardware. The range of lines exposed allows external ROM and RAM expansion, thus allowing for ROM cartridges or for expansion devices to internally include the required operating software on ROM.

Printer port
The printer port is compatible with the then standard Centronics parallel interface allows for connection of many different types of printers from low quality (e.g. low-resolution thermal printers) to high quality printers, such as fixed font daisy wheel printers or laser printers, though the latter were uncommon and expensive during the period of commercial availability of the Oric range. Most contemporary computer printers could produce text output without requiring specific drivers, and often followed de facto standards for simple graphics. More advanced use of the printer would have required a specific driver which, given the proliferation of different home computers and standards of the time, may or may not have been available.

Peripherals

Colour plotter
Tangerine's MCP-40 is a plotter with mechanics by Alps Electric. The same mechanism was also used as the basis for similar low-cost plotters produced by various home computer manufacturers around that time. These included the Atari 1020, the Commodore 1520, the Tandy/Radio Shack CGP-115, the Texas Instruments HX-1000, the Mattel Aquarius 4615, and probably also the Sharp MZ-1P16 (for MZ-800 series).

Prestel adaptor
The Prestel adaptor produced by Eureka (Informatika) was the first adaptor produced for the Oric-1 and Oric Atmos computers. However this adaptor was only furnished with very limited software.

Clones
The Atmos was licensed in Yugoslavia and sold as Nova 64. The clones were Atmos-based, the only difference being the logo indicating ORIC NOVA 64 instead of Oric Atmos 48K. This is to indicate the installed 64 KB of RAM – which was also true of the Atmos –, 16 KB of which is masked in both by the ROM at startup, leaving 48 KB to work with the BASIC language.

In Bulgaria, the Atmos clone was named Pravetz 8D and produced between 1985 and 1991. The Pravetz is entirely hardware and software compatible with the Oric Atmos. The biggest change on the hardware side is the larger white case that hosts a comfortable mechanical keyboard and an integrated power supply. The BASIC ROM has been patched to host both a Western European and Cyrillic alphabet the upper case character set produces Western European characters, while lower case gives Cyrillic letters. In order to ease the use of the two alphabets, the Pravetz 8D is fitted with a Caps Lock key. A Disk II compatible interface and a custom DOS, called DOS-8D, were created in 1987–88 by Borislav Zahariev.

See also
 :Category:Oric games

References

External links
 Oric FAQ
 Oric: The Story so Far
 Oric Atmos review March 1984 Your Computer
 Microtan 65 Oric-1 Oric Atmos at the Old Computers Museum
 Oric.org community portal (French)

Early microcomputers
6502-based home computers
Home computers
Tangerine Computer Systems